USS Anchorage may refer to one of two U.N. Navy ships named for Anchorage, Alaska:

 , the lead ship of its class, was decommissioned in October 2003

United States Navy ship names